Quantum level may refer to:

Energy level, a particle that is bound can only take on certain discrete values of energy, called energy levels
Quantum realm, also called the quantum scale, a physics term referring to scales where quantum mechanical effects become important